Champaka Priyadarshana Hewage Ramanayake (born January 8, 1965, in Galle), or Champaka Ramanayake, is a former Sri Lankan cricketer who played in 18 Tests and 62 ODIs from 1986 to 1995.

Champaka is a highly experienced and respected international cricket coach now.
He worked for Sri Lanka cricket board as a national fast bowling coach for 15 years and Bangladesh national fast bowling coach as 2 years.
Champaka's proudest and highest achievement is discovering Lasith Malinga at the age of 16 and guiding and coaching him to be the best fast bowler Sri Lanka ever produced and one of the best in the world.

He is the current high performance fast bowling coach of the Bangladesh national side.

School times
Champaka who had his education at Richmond College, Galle is widely regarded as one of the steadiest bowlers ever produced by Sri Lanka.

Trivia
Champaka is the only person to bowl in international cricket at Ray Mitchell Oval, in Mackay, Australia. The venue hosted its only international match during the 1992 Cricket World Cup, and the match was washed out after his first two deliveries.

International record

Test 5 Wicket hauls

References

1965 births
Living people
Sri Lanka Test cricketers
Sri Lanka One Day International cricketers
Sri Lankan cricketers
Basnahira North cricketers
Tamil Union Cricket and Athletic Club cricketers
Alumni of Richmond College, Galle
Ruhuna cricketers
Cricketers from Galle
Sri Lankan cricket coaches
Coaches of the United Arab Emirates national cricket team